Tolka may refer to:
River Tolka, a river in Dublin, Ireland
Tolka Park, a football stadium in Dublin 
Tolka (Taz), a river in Yamalo-Nenets Autonomous Okrug, Russia
Tolka, Krasnoselkupsky District, a village in Yamalo-Nenets Autonomous Okrug, Russia